Doto hydrallmaniae is a species of sea slug, a nudibranch, a marine gastropod mollusc in the family Dotidae.

Distribution
This species was first described from the Isle of Man, United Kingdom.

Description
This nudibranch is translucent white with dark red spots on the ceratal tubercles. Its body size attains 10 mm.

EcologyDoto hydrallmaniae feeds on the hydroid Hydrallmania falcata'', family Sertulariidae.

References

Dotidae
Gastropods described in 1992